Prasar Bharati (abbreviated as PB; Hindi: Praśar Bharati, lit. Indian Broadcaster) is India's state-owned public broadcaster, headquartered in New Delhi. It is a statutory autonomous body set up by an Act of Parliament and comprises the Doordarshan Television Network and Akashvani All India Radio, which were earlier media units of the Ministry of Information and Broadcasting. The Parliament of India passed the Prasar Bharati Act to grant this autonomy in 1990, but it was not enacted until 15 September 1997.

The Prasar Bharati board chairperson's position remains vacant since Dr A. Surya Prakash finished his second term in February 2020. He had succeeded Dr Mrinal Pande. Sh. Gaurav Dwivedi is the CEO of Prasar Bharati (he succeeded Shashi Shekhar Vempati who was the CEO until June 2022).

Reuters Institute Digital News Report 2021 revealed that DD News and All India Radio are the most trusted News brands in India.

Act 
The Prasar Bharati Act provides for the establishment of a Broadcasting Corporation, to be known as Prasar Bharati, and define its composition, functions, and powers. The Act grants autonomy to All India Radio and to Doordarshan, both of which were previously under government control. The Act received the assent of the President of India on 12 September 1990 after being unanimously passed by Parliament. It was finally implemented in November 1997. By the Prasar Bharati Act, all property, assets, debts, liabilities, payments of money due, as well as all suits and legal proceedings involving Akashvani (All India Radio) and Doordarshan were transferred to Prasar Bharati. 

The organization started as All India Radio (AIR) in the past and Doordarshan (DD) was born to cater television services later and finally came Prasar Bharati (PB) by enactment of an act by the parliament,

Board 
The Prasar Bharati Act vests the general superintendence, direction, and management of affairs of the Corporation in the Prasar Bharati Board which may exercise all such powers and do all such acts and things as may be exercised or done by the corporation.

The Prasar Bharati Board consists of:
Chairman
One Executive Member
One Member (Finance)
One Member (Personnel)
Six Part-time Members
Director-General (Akashvani), ex officio
Director-General (Doordarshan), ex officio
One representative of the Union Ministry of Information and Broadcasting (India), to be nominated by that Ministry and
Two representatives of the employees, of whom one shall be elected by the engineering staff from amongst themselves and one shall be elected by the other employee from amongst themselves.

The President of India appoints the chairman and the other Members, except the ex officio members, nominated member and the elected members. Board meetings must be held at least once in every three months each year.

Current members of Prasar Bharati Board 

 Chairman — Vacant 
 Chief Executive Officer — Sh.Gaurav Dwivedi
 Member (Personnel) — Additional charge with CEO Shri Gaurav Dwivedi
 Member (Finance) — Sh.DPS Negi

Part-time members 
 Additional Secretary and Representative of Ministry of Information & Broadcasting — Ms. Neerja Sekhar
 Ex Officio members  — Vacant
Part-time member : Shaina NC, Alok Agrawal, Ashok Kumar Tandon, Sanjay Gupta

Vacancies 
Chairman – Vacant. The Chairman is appointed by the President.
Member (Personnel) – Additional charge with CEO Shri Gaurav Dwivedi
Ex-Officio Members – Vacant
Nominated Members – 2 Vacancies

Revenue growth 
At nearly Rs 1350 crore, Prasar Bharati closed the financial year 2021–2022 with a strong revenue growth of 13 percent from commercial operations. Prasar Bharati Chief Executive Officer Shashi Shekhar Vempati explained through tweets that the growth was “fuelled primarily by strong post COVID recovery of All India Radio and continued growth momentum of FreeDish and Digital despite uncertainty of pandemic. While road to financial self sustainability for the Public Broadcaster is a way off, foundation has been laid with key reforms such as phase out of obsolete technologies, consolidation of redundant operations, IT/Digital enablement of functions and new avenues for monetization.”

Funding of public broadcaster in India 
Responding to claims of Prasar Bharati being run on public money, Prasar Bharati CEO Shashi Shekhar Vempati through a tweet clarified that DD has to earn its money to run its operations. Public money does not fund broadcast operational expenditure of DD. Public funding is only to the extent of salaries of government employees on deputation to DD.

In 2019, addressing the gathering at Kautilya Fellows Programme, Prasar Bharati CEO Shashi Shekhar Vempati elaborated upon the difference between funding of public broadcasters in other countries and in India, “In India, we have a very different model for two reasons. First, when Prasar Bharati was created in 1997, all the assets of the AIR and Doordarshan were transferred to this corporation, but it is not a corporation in the true sense. Corporates in India come under Companies Act and this Act defines whether you are a public undertaking, whether you are a government company or whether you are a limited liability partnership etc. Prasar Bharati doesn’t come under the ambit of the Companies Act. So, it is not a corporate in true sense, it’s a statutory autonomous body. Secondly, when it was created in 1997, all of the employees of DD and AIR continued to remain employees of the Government of India. So we have this hybrid model where the corporate is autonomous but everyone working within it are the employees of the government. What this also means is that their salaries, pensions etc., is funded from the government. So if you take away these wages and related expenses, all of the operational expenditure has to be funded by revenue generation from commercial advertising and sponsorship and whatever other commercial activities Prasar Bharati can undertake, which is a huge challenge because nowhere in the world does a public broadcaster sustains itself through advertising. In India, we ended up doing it because of the unique model we have where operations have to be funded from our revenues."

Public Broadcasting in India over last eight years 
Public Broadcasting landscape in India has seen a dramatic transformation since 2014, inspired by Prime Minister Narendra Modi’s mantra of making Sabka Prayas a mass movement.

Over the past 8 years, DD FreeDish has seen dramatic growth doubling its reach. DD FreeDish DTH has emerged as the largest free to air public DTH platform serving more than 4.5 crore families. During COVID-19 lockdown when schools were not functioning, the educational TV channels on DD FreeDish DTH came to the aid of millions of students across India.

During COVID, DD and AIR emerged as forces for the greater public good playing a critical role in social messaging at every stage from precautions to COVID appropriate behavior to overcoming Vaccine hesitancy. Industry data has estimated that COVID-19 social messaging by Doordarshan was amongst the highest across TV channels in India. The newly created PBNS digital news unit played an active role in busting fake news working in tandem with PIB’s Fact-check Unit.

Prasar Bharati has undertaken the single biggest reform in Television Broadcastingin India with the phasing out of more than 1200 obsolete Analog Terrestrial TV Transmitters. This has not only saved crores of expenditure of Doordarshan but it has made valuable UHF Spectrum available for expanding 5G services and Rural Communication services

Key technology reforms over the last 8 years including the infusion of Information Technology systems across DD and AIR ensured that the 25,000 humongous work force and more than 1000 Offices, Broadcasting Centres across the country managed to remain operational with 24*7 news services, educational and entertainment programming.

The footprint of Doordarshan has expanded significantly between 2017 and 2021. In 2017, the number of satellite channels stood at 23 as opposed to 36 in 2021. A dedicated channel for Agriculture was launched in the form of DD Kisan which has since made natural farming a mass movement. Many new regional channels, including DD Arun Prabha, DD Chattisgarh, DD Uttarakhand, DD Jharkhand and DD Assam, have been added to the bouquet of DD channels to serve the needs of areas which were earlier ignored.

Doordarshan’s international English News channel DD India has seen phenomenal growth lately. In terms of TV reach, DD India recently became number one English News channel in the country. Even the viewership for DD India has witnessed a consistent upward trend, registering a whopping total growth of almost 150%. Staying true to its mandate with which it was launched by Prasar Bharati in January 2019, DD India has now become India’s window to the world with reach to Korea, Bangladesh, Mauritius, Maldives, Australia, USA, UK, Canada and more than 190 countries through Satellite and OTT platforms.

To cover as much area and population as possible across the country, All India Radio network has also expanded its footprint from 412 FM channels in 2017 to 514 in 2021 and from 413 stations in 2017 to 485 in 2021. This has further been augmented by more than 40 satellite radio channels available through DD FreeDish accessible across the land mass of India.

Prasar Bharati has expanded social media base of DD and AIR with more than 300 Twitter handles, 190+ YouTube channels and NewsOnAir App with more than 2 Million downloads. Digital is now integral to all broadcast activities with daily 800+ digital uploads happening across the networks of DD and AIR. NewsOnAir App has made AIR stations accessible across the world in more than 190 countries. The App has around 270 AIR live-streams.

To make the public broadcaster’s content more inclusive, Doordarshan now provides sign language commentary for major events like Republic Day, Mann Ki Baat, and weekly Cabinet briefings. To make the public broadcaster’s content more inclusive, Doordarshan now provides sign language commentary for major events like Republic Day, Mann Ki Baat, and weekly Cabinet briefings.

Preserving and restoring India’s culture, tradition and history, Prasar Bharati Archives digitized rare audio-video content exclusively available with All India Radio and Doordarshan since 1930s.

As an effort towards realizing PM Modi’s vision of Aatmanirbhar Bharat in broadcasting, Prasar Bharati has also established a Centre of Excellence for Media and Broadcasting Technologies at IIT Kanpur, to explore direct to mobile 5G broadcasting, AI and other emerging areas.

Strategic interventions (2017 onwards) 
In May 2020, Doordarshan and All India Radio began broadcasting weather reports on Mirpur, Muzaffarabad and Gilgit in Pakistan-occupied Kashmir (PoK) in their prime time news bulletins. Pakistan had rejected this move by India, terming it as a "legally void" action to change the status of the region.

As laid down in the Prasar Bharati Act, Prasar Bharati had to develop its own news dissemination arm, which was not acted upon till 2019 when Prasar Bharati launched its digital arm Prasar Bharati News Services (PBNS). In the beginning, PBNS focused on creating a presence on and disseminating content through social media platforms like Twitter, Facebook and YouTube. During pandemic, PBNS Telegram channel was set up to distribute text, videos, audio and photographs instantly and share accurate information to newsrooms, free-of-cost. Media reports suggest that this news service, which is free to use for now, is likely to be made a subscription-based service going forward. The public broadcaster is readying an internal IT platform to aggregate all content generated by Prasar Bharati resource persons across India, along with wire services that the public broadcaster subscribes to.

Reforms in public broadcasting in India (2017 onwards) 
Obsolete technologies are being replaced with new technologies. Starting from 2017, more than 1200 old technology Analog Transmitters have been phased out and 23 Digital Transmitters have been installed at 19 locations across the country.

E-Office operation has been implemented across all offices all over the country – Started in 2019 to make the office operations efficient, faster and paperless; all 577 Prasar Bharati network offices across the country adopted it by mid-2021. This has drastically reduced average time taken to clear files from seven days to 24 hours. This has also saved organisation's expenditure on paper by 45% between August 2019 and June 2021.

On the revenue and expenditure front, 150 crore per annum has been the average operating surplus between 2017 and 2021, thanks to 120% growth in FreeDish revenue, 200% growth in Digital, reduction in DD – AIR public ad spend by 70%, and other expenditure rationalization initiatives like 60% decrease in expenditure on obsolete modes of broadcasting.

Global outreach since 2017 
In pursuance of its vision to expand the global reach of DD India channel, to put forth India's perspective on various international developments on global platforms and to showcase India's culture and values to the world, India's public broadcaster Prasar Bharati has signed a Memorandum of Understanding with ‘Yupp TV’, an over-the-top (OTT) platform, which is a gateway for television viewers across the globe. With this, DD India is now available on the OTT platform of Yupp TV in USA, UK, Europe, Middle East, Singapore, Australia and New Zealand. DD India, Prasar Bharati's international channel, is India's window to the world. The channel through its various programmes offers international viewers India's perspective on all domestic and global developments. Available in more than 190 countries, DD India also acts as a bridge between India and Indian Diaspora spread across the world.

Prasar Bharati has collaborated with public broadcasters of more than 30 countries including Australia, Germany, Saudi Arabia, Argentina, Korea, Bangladesh and Nepal in the field of media and broadcasting. Through this, Doordarshan channels have been made available for viewing in many of these countries. Prasar Bharati engages in co-production, joint broadcasting and exchange of programmes across multiple genres. These agreements also facilitate exchange of professionals for training purposes.

Doordarshan is hosting the international finals of Robocon 2022 in August. The Robot competition, which is organised by Asia-Pacific Broadcasting Union and hosted by different member countries every year, will be held in New Delhi in 2022.  Prasar Bharati has created a page on its website for more information related to DD Robocon 2022. You can visit the page here -https://newsonair.com/robocon2022/

Doordarshan and All India Radio channels are available in more than 190 countries across the world. Doordarshan's English News channel DD India has reach to 190+ countries through Satellite, OTT platforms like Yupp TV & Korean platform MyK and Prasar Bharati's NewsOnAir App.

More than 240 streams of All India Radio are available on NewsOnAir App which has reach to more than 190 countries. Some of these All India Radio streams like Vividh Bharati, AIR Punjabi and AIR News 24*7 are quite popular in various parts of the world from Europe to Africa and West Asia to North America, including countries like UK, France, Ireland, Kenya, US, Canada,  UAE, Saudi Arabia and Pakistan.

On 21 March 2022, Prasar Bharati signed an MoU with Special Broadcasting Service (SBS), Australia's public service broadcaster to boost co-operation in the field of broadcasting. This has expanded the reach of DD News, DD India and multiple language services of DD News amongst the Indian diaspora in Australia.

In February 2020, major American and European TV News Networks carried DD India's coverage of the then US President Donald Trump's India visit.

In December 2020, Prasar Bharati achieved another global milestone in broadcasting with the election of CEO Shashi Shekhar Vempati as the Vice President of Asia Pacific Broadcasting Union (ABU), one of the largest broadcasting associations in the world.

Manpower audit implementation since 2017 
In 2017, three years after Sam Pitroda-led expert committee on Prasar Bharati had recommended a comprehensive manpower audit of Doordarshan and All India Radio, media reports alleged that not only minimal action was taken on the Sam Pitroda Committee report of February 2014 to revitalise Prasar Bharati, but also the Department of Expenditure had expressed its inability to undertake the work of manpower audit despite assurances in reply to several questions in the Parliament.

In November 2018, through tweets, Prasar Bharati CEO Shashi Shekhar Vempati said, “The 151st Board Meeting of Prasar Bharati held earlier in the week was one of the most productive meetings on the wide range of issues on which decisions were taken. An important and long pending decision was on the manpower audit recommended by Sam Pitroda Committee. Happy to share that we are finally kicking off the manpower audit of Prasar Bharati, encompassing Doordarshan and Akashvani AIR, over the next many months. We will be assisted by EY India in this project which will lay out the future blueprint for India’s public service broadcaster.”

In February 2021, findings were completed by Ernst and Young, which suggested alterations. The findings show that nearly half the organisation's 25,000 employees are employed in the engineering division, whereas the corresponding strength for BBC is at a little over 10%. The content team at Prasar Bharti constitutes less than 20% of the workforce, while BBC's content team accounts for 70%. Manpower costs account for over 60% of Prasar Bharati's expenses, and just around 30% of BBC's.

Transformations and Initiatives (2017 onwards) 
Over last five years, Prasar Bharati's TV (DD) and Radio (AIR) network has undergone major transformations in the field of technology, content and broadcasting. The number of IT-based portals and Apps for ease of doing business (external) stood at nil in 2017. In 2021, it stands at five. IT-based portals (internal) now stand at two, while in 2017 it was nil.

IT-enabled operations – 

100% implementation of e-Office at 577 offices across Prasar Bharati network. This has drastically reduced average time taken to clear files. While in 2017 it was 7 days; in 2021, it is anything between 2 and 24 hours. This has also saved organisation's expenditure on paper by 45% between August 2019 and June 2021.
To bring transparency, Talent Acquisition and content acquisition processes have been made online.
Dashboard has been created to monitor various projects.
Procurements and Billing System for DD and AIR are now IT-based.
Independent HR Management software Tool has been created.

Innovative efforts in Audience research –  Prasar Bharati's Audience Research team releases weekly NewsOnAir Radio Live-stream Rankings (Global & Domestic).

Inclusive Coverage –  Sign Language commentary for special events, including big sporting events and Mann Ki Baat.

Radio – TV Integration –  Visual Radio initiatives like visual versions of Mann Ki Baat, Rangoli and TV Visual Commentary on YouTube.

International brand of Doordarshan –  Expressions of Interest for blue print to make an international brand of Doordarshan being reviewed.

Cloud Based Media Operations to be implemented  for Broadcasting and Archival Media

5G Broadcast technology  pilot underway with IIT Kanpur

DD India –  Doordarshan's International channel DD India is available in 37 countries. It is now also available on Hotstar and iTV platforms in United States.

NewsOnAir App –  The App has more than two million downloads and is available in more than 150 countries. It offers more than 270 radio and TV live-streams.

DD FreeDish –  DD Free Dish is the largest DTH operator in the country with reach to more than 43 Million Households in 2022. This figure stood at just 22 Million in 2017. The platform has 167 TV channels, including 50+ dedicated Educational channels and 48 Radio channels. In 2020–21, it generated revenue of more than Rs 700 Crore. This was an impressive jump from Rs 250 Crore in 2017.

Prasar Bharati News Services –  PBNS has established itself as the digital news wing of Prasar Bharati through its Telegram Channel and Twitter handle. Its Twitter handle has 100K+ followers and Telegram channel has 15K+ subscribers. PBNS has created a digital news gathering platform called NDMS which is being used by all stringers and part time Correspondents of DD and AIR across India.

Going Green –  All India Radio has shifted its entire fleet to Electric vehicles for all its transportation needs. Prasar Bharati CEO Shashi Shekhar Vempati flagged off a fleet of 26 Electric Vehicles at Akashvani Bhawan in New Delhi on 2 December 2021. The charging network for the Electric Vehicles has been laid by the Civil Construction Wing of Prasar Bharati.

Transformation of Doordarshan (2017 onwards) 
The footprint of Doordarshan has increased between 2017 and 2021. In 2017, the number of satellite channels stood at 23 as opposed to 36 in 2021.

 Old Technology Analogue Transmitters phased out –   Rolling out broadcasting reforms at Doordarshan since 2017, Prasar Bharati has swiftly phased out obsolete broadcasting technologies like Analog Terrestrial TV Transmitters (ATT), paving way for paradigm shift to emerging technologies and new content opportunities. Analog Terrestrial TV was an obsolete technology and phaseout of the same was in both public interest and national interest as it makes valuable spectrum available for new and emerging technologies such as 5G apart from reducing wasteful expenditure on power. With the exception of around 50 analog terrestrial TV transmitters in strategic locations, Prasar Bharati phased out the rest of the obsolete analog transmitters by 31 March 2022.

Timeline of ATT Phase out and Resource rationalisation:

DD FreeDish
DD FreeDish becomes largest DTH platform –   Registering unparalleled growth in the TV distribution industry, Doordarshan FreeDish has become the largest DTH platform with reach to more than 43 Million households. With improved auction processes leading to addition of better quality & quantity of channels in various genres, between 2017 and 2022 alone, the Free DTH service of Doordarshan clocked a stellar growth of almost 100% from 22 Million in 2017 to 43 Million in 2022. Recently released FICCI-EY Report 2022 corroborates why and how DD FreeDish continues its strong growth trajectory, “Free Television continued to grow its base to reach an estimated 43 Million subscribers on the back of less expensive television sets, economic issues, and addition of new channels to the platform.” The report quotes FreeDish distributors mentioning year on year growth in sales of DD FreeDish set-top boxes. In stark comparison to 22 Million subscribers in 13 years between 2004 and 2017, DD FreeDish's growth over the last 5 years stands out. In just five years between 2017 and 2022, FreeDish has added another 21 Million subscribers, taking the total to 43 Million. Initiated by the Atal Bihari Vajpayee-led NDA government in early 2000s, DD FreeDish, then known as DD Direct Plus, was subsequently launched in 2004. After being revamped during the Narendra Modi-led NDA government era, the platform saw rapid growth in recent years. Over the past seven years, since 2015, the subscription base of DD FreeDish has expanded significantly by more than 100%. Prasar Bharati CEO Shashi Shekhar Vempati claims that such growth of DD FreeDish is a result of a 2019 change in policy, “Changes were made to how FreeDish DTH slot was being auctioned. From an earlier system where auctions were held randomly throughout the year, we have switched to an annual e-Auction system. Further, from just two categories of slots, we have moved to five categories of slots based on genre and language. This helped bring differential pricing to these slots. Lastly, the e-Auction methodology was also changed to ensure competition and prevent cartelisation with a progressive increase in the reserve price. The cumulative impact of these policy changes has resulted in the growth of FreeDish revenues.”

 DD FreeDish as a platform for national outreach –   Public and National Outreach to the masses across India through television has received a tremendous boost with the DD FreeDish Platform. Staying true to its public service mandate, Prasar Bharati's DD FreeDish had stood out in serving the people during the pandemic by enabling massive public outreach and dissemination through its platform. While the traditional education system struggled due to the pandemic, DD FreeDish had then come to the rescue by providing a platform for multiple educational channels, thus ensuring continuing education to students across India. Recent viewership data has further revealed the central role being played by DD FreeDish as a platform for public and national outreach through television across India. Of the universe of TV Viewership for Pariksha Pe Charcha 2022, 33% of the viewers watched the event on various TV channels available on the DD FreeDish platform. It is to be noted that several industry estimates have pegged the install base of DD FreeDish at around 20% of the total TV households in India. Further underlining the importance of DD FreeDish for national outreach is the fact that 26% of the viewers of the Republic Day Parade 2022 viewed it on various channels available on DD FreeDish. In an interview with an English daily, Prasar Bharati CEO Shashi Shekhar Vempati elaborated upon the expansion plan of DD FreeDish, "FreeDish is largely concentrated in the Hindi speaking states, apart from Maharashtra, Gujarat and Goa. We are working to expand FreeDish footprint in non-Hindi states and this will be a focus area in the coming years."

Indicating that the growth of DD FreeDish is impacting the pay TV market in India, an article published by the Mint says that the Public service broadcaster Prasar Bharati's free-to-air direct-to-home (DTH) service – DD FreeDish – is on a roll. In the last two years of the pandemic, millions of viewers have migrated to the platform that offers entertainment without any monthly charges unlike the cable or DTH operators that they subscribed to. Even private satellite TV broadcasters admit to the phenomenal growth of DD FreeDish in recent years, especially during covid when economic stress pushed low-income groups, rural and semi-rural consumers to cut their cable bills and opt for a free service.

In collaboration with Prasar Bharati, renowned Chef Sanjeev Kapoor has launched two new Dishes in the name of India's largest DTH platform DD FreeDish – 'DD FreeDish Hing ka Achar' and 'DD FreeDish Aam ki Launji'. This is with the advent of Chef Sanjeev Kapoor's dedicated food channel 'Food Food' on DD FreeDish. This is first time that a dedicated food channel has come on board DD FreeDish.

On the occasion of silver jubilee celebrations of Telecom Regulatory Authority of India, MoS I&B Dr L Murugan elaborated upon the reforms undertaken at Doordarshan. He talked about how phase-out of Analog Terrestrial Transmitters has resulted in availability of valuable spectrum. He also spoke about the role of DD FreeDish DTH as the largest platform coming to the aid of students during COVID.

Transformation of DD India as an English news channel 
Prasar Bharati's English News channel DD India has seen phenomenal growth both on TV and Digital. It has more than two lakh subscribers on YouTube.  In terms of TV reach, DD India is number one English News channel in the country. As per BARC data, DD India reaches more than 8 Million viewers, highest in the English News genre. Its closest competitors are able to manage only around half the reach of DD India. Even the viewership for DD India has been witnessing a consistent upward weekly growth, registering a whopping total growth of almost 150%.

Living up to its mandate with which it was launched by Prasar Bharati in January 2019, DD India has now become India's window to the world with reach to more than 190 countries through Satellite, OTT platforms and NewsOnAir App. As envisaged, DD India has established itself as a global influencer on India related issues through its sharp analysis & commentary, thought provoking views/opinions and cutting edge visual presentation.

Here's a timeline of how DD India became the number one English News channel:

DD India also acts as a bridge between India and Indian Diaspora spread across the world. The channel through its various programmes offers international viewers India's perspective on all domestic and global developments. Some of the high viewership shows on DD India are India Ideas, World Today, Indian Diplomacy, DD Dialogue, News Night etc.

Transformation of All India Radio (2017 onwards) 
From 413 in 2017, the number of All India Radio stations has gone up to 485 in 2021. All India Radio's FM stations are now reaching 70 percent of the Indian population. As part of Prasar Bharati's drive to phase out obsolete technologies, the number of Short Wave and Medium Wave stations has come down from 48 to 12 and 148 to 128 respectively between 2017 and 2021.

Digital Growth since 2017 

Since 2017, Prasar Bharati has shifted its focus to digital first which has rendered promising results with a digital network spread across more than 300 Twitter handles, 190 YouTube channels, multiple news websites and NewsOnAir App with more than two million downloads. The digital network viewership growth has witnessed a 66% rise since 2017. Now Digital has become integral to all Prasar Bharati activities with daily 800+ digital uploads happening across the network, so that all in-house produced news and non-news content is available for on-demand consumption on digital platforms. NewsOnAir App has been a game-changer with 270+ radio and TV live-streams.

Between 2017 and 2022, Prasar Bharati's digital platforms across the country have together written a brilliant growth story with many of its YouTube channels already in the Million club and multiple others inching closer to the milestone, together taking the current total YouTube subscription base to more than two crores. In 2021, more than 185 YouTube channels of Doordarshan and All India Radio together registered more than a billion views. Their ‘watch time’ for the entire duration of 2021 summed up to a figure of 94 Million Hours. YouTube channels of both DD News and DD National crossed 4 Million Subscribers in 2021. Prasar Bharati's App NewsOnAir clocked a listenership of 214 Million+ in 2021. Prasar Bharati's digital platforms in the remotest areas of Northeast registered significant milestones in 2021, by together clocking more than 220 Million Views and 1 Million+ Subscribers on YouTube.

Digital Transformation - Prasar Bharati News Services and Digital Platform (2019 onwards) 

Samir Kumar is an alumnus of IIT Kharagpur & IIM Calcutta he is also an ex-IAS(allied). He was appointed as Head of PBNS - Prasar Bharati News Services  (Prasar Bharati's Digital wing) to transform and bring the Digital First approach of public broadcasting in India.

He has worked with ABN AMRO, Deutsche Bank and RBS in London, Tokyo and Singapore at senior positions.

Archives – Preserving India’s History and Culture 

Prasar Bharati's National Archives, India's oldest and biggest audio-visual Archives, has an exclusive collection of rare recordings of historical value – interviews, documentaries, features, music, radio plays, etc. It is a treasure trove of not only the memorable performances of the great artistes, who have contributed to India's rich cultural, music and dance heritage but also a collection of rare media assets related to important events like Independence Day celebrations, Republic Day Parades, address to the nation by Prime Ministers, Presidents etc. as well as other important broadcasts since the advent of broadcasting in our country. These rare assets are in the form of sound recordings and audio visual footage in all genres like music, dance, drama, interviews, short films, documentaries, feature films etc.

Archival activities started in the form of Transcription Service of Radio recordings on 3 April 1954, with transcription of speeches of all dignitaries, especially the presidents and prime ministers of India. Though informal archiving had been there in the country before 1954, setting up of transcription service converted it into an organized activity. Doordarshan Archives was established in 2004 with an objective to digitize and preserve the valuable audio-visual footages. Initially the archival setups in AIR and Doordarshan grew separately under their respective verticals. In 2018, these separate setups were combined and brought under a common umbrella as a new vertical ‘Prasar Bharati Archives’.

Radio Autobiographies are one of the unique collections in the Archives of Prasar Bharati, wherein audio autobiography of eminent personalities who have made invaluable contributions in different fields of nation-building is recorded. Besides being anecdotal about the lives and works of the personalities, these Radio Autobiographies also chronicle the contemporary history of India narrated through the life's journey of these eminent personalities.

In his Radio Autobiography recorded by All India Radio in 1986, India's then leading Industrialist and former Chairman of Tata Group Jehangir Ratanji Dadabhoy Tata recalls his memories of the Emergency era, his conversations with Indira Gandhi and Sanjay Gandhi on the excesses during the Emergency. Recollecting one of his interactions with Indira Gandhi in the beginning of Emergency, JRD Tata said, “When she declared Emergency, I went to see her. I said, Indira ji, why did you have to put all these people in jail including old people like Morarji Desai. She said, because they were plotting against me. I can't have people against me from within.”

In an interaction with All India Radio in January 1986, Sahitya Akademi Award winner and renowned poet Amrita Pritam said that in popular culture, people count Hinduism as one of the religions along with Islam, Christianity, etc. But in reality, Hinduism is not a religion. Everyone born in Hindustan is a Hindu.

This treasure trove is being digitized and made available on Prasar Bharati Archives YouTube channel in public interest for academic purposes. Apart from the content mentioned above, audio of around 50 original Constituent Assembly Speeches from 1946–1949 have been uploaded on this YouTube channel.

Priceless recordings of the likes of maestros Ustad Bismillah Khan, MS Subbulakshmi, Begum Akhtar, M Balamuralikrishna and the epic Ramcharitmanas, among others are part of Prasar Bharati archives and are available on the counter at Akashwani Bhawan on Parliament Street in Delhi.

Prasar Bharati Archives has contributed significantly to PradhanMantri Sangrahalaya, inaugurated by PM Modi on 14 April 2022, providing about 206 hours of audio and 53 hours of video content. This includes Address to Constituent Assembly (Tryst with Destiny), Broadcast to the Nation on 1st Independence Day, Oath-taking ceremony, Inauguration of Atomic Energy Establishment and Opening of the 1st Atomic Reactor, Declaration of Emergency, Address to the UN General Assembly, Non-Aligned Conference, Inauguration of Delhi Metro and much more.

From among the rare audio-video content of historical, political and cultural significance available in Prasar Bharati Archives, we have created decade-wise YouTube playlists of such content starting from 1930s till 2000s.

Awards and accolades 
DD National's TV series based on pet care ‘Best Friend Forever’ won ENBA Award 2021 for the best in-depth Hindi series at the 14th edition of the Exchange4media News Broadcasting Awards (ENBA).

DD Kisan's show ‘Apna Pashu Chikitsak’ won ENBA Special award 2021 for best campaign for social cause (Hindi).

TV and Radio shows produced by Doordarshan and All India Radio respectively got multiple awards at the ABU – UNESCO Peace Media Awards 2021 at Kuala Lumpur in Malaysia. Doordarshan's programme 'DEAFinitely Leading the Way' won an award under ‘Living Well with Super Diversity’ category, while All India Radio's programme ‘Living on the edge – The coastal lives’ won another award in the category of ‘Ethical & Sustainable Relationship with Nature’.

Channel Manager at Prasar Bharati Sports Abhishek Dubey and Senior Content Manager Pravin Sinha received Panchjanya-Organiser Media Awards 2022 for Sports.

Ashok Shrivastav from DD News got the Panchjanya-Organiser Media Awards 2022 for Social Media.

Divya Bharadwaj got the Panchjanya-Organiser Media Awards 2022 for Environment for the DD National show Rag Rag mein Ganga.

Ashwini Mishra from DD News got the Panchjanya-Organiser Media Awards 2022 for Arts and Culture.

Umesh Chaturvedi of All India Radio News was awarded with the prestigious Devrishi Narad journalism award.

Controversies 
In 2010, as many as 24 candidates out of the 30 selected for the posts of journalists in Doordarshan News were alleged to have been appointed on the basis of political considerations. For example, one of the successful candidates was closely related to a former Congress Minister of State for Information and Broadcasting, another successful candidate was the daughter of a sitting Congress Union minister, and a third was a close relative of Union Commerce Minister Anand Sharma.

The number of applicants called for interview was increased from 25 to 35 to accommodate the daughter of a Congress politician, who held the 33rd rank, and would have otherwise been eliminated at the cut-off stage. Another successful candidate, Anika Kalra Kalha, was not even called for an audition and reporting skills test, and the remark in the relevant columns read “Did not qualify for this stage”. Similarly, the weightage given to interviews was arbitrarily increased two days before they were held.

In 2014, over allegations of DD editing out portions of interview of the then BJP's PM candidate Narendra Modi, then Prasar Bharati CEO Jawhar Sircar had admitted that some parts of the interview "were apparently edited" and pointed a finger at then I&B Minister Manish Tewari for failing to grant the "operational autonomy" that the public broadcaster had been seeking for years.

In August 2017, then Tripura CM Manik Sarkar alleged that Doordarshan and All India Radio had refused to broadcast his Independence Day speech unless he reworked it.

In September 2017, following instructions from the ministry of information and broadcasting, Doordarshan had put on hold prime time slots auctioned to Ekta Kapoor's Balaji Telefilms and Saaibaba Telefilms.

Fake offer/appointment letters for jobs at Prasar Bharati's DD Kisan channel were given by scamsters on fake letter heads of DD Kisan.

In September 2017, following a complaint of alleged abuse of dominance with regard to infrastructural facilities for FM radio broadcasting, Competition Commission ordered a fresh investigation against Prasar Bharati.

In March 2018, then Prasar Bharati Chairman Dr. A Surya Prakash said that the I&B Ministry had been refusing funds to Prasar Bharati since December 2017 and that the funds for the month of January and February were drawn from the broadcaster's contingency funds to pay its employees’ salaries.

In early 2019, Union Information and Broadcasting Ministry floated a draft Bill ‘Prasar Bharati (Broadcasting Corporation of India) Amendment Bill, 2019’, which would have given Ministry the power to appoint Director Generals of Doordarshan and All India Radio directly, instead of the then practice of recruitment of DGs through Prasar Bharati Board. The Bill sought to remove the provision to establish a recruitment board ‘Prasar Bharati Recruitment Board’ (PBRB). According to the explanatory note of the draft Bill, “As per Section 9 of the Prasar Bharati Act, officers and employees of the public broadcaster were to be appointed in ‘consultation’ with the Recruitment Board, which was to be established as per Section 10 of the Act. However, the Prasar Bharati Recruitment Board (PBRB) could not be established due to one or another reason” and the ministry has now decided “not to establish PBRB” and remove the relevant section of the Act which empowered Prasar Bharati to set up recruitment boards.” Soon after, the notification seeking public feedback on the draft Bill was removed from the Ministry’s website, and another notice was issued which said that “the matter has been kept in abeyance till further orders”.

In April 2019, then Congress President Rahul Gandhi's office did not respond to Prasar Bharati CEO's request for Gandhi's interview by DD News. Earlier that month, Congress had submitted a memorandum to the Election Commission with allegations of bias in the political coverage by the public broadcaster.

In October 2019, Prasar Bharati suspended a Chennai Doordarshan Kendra official citing "disciplinary proceedings". According to media reports, Doordarshan Kendra assistant director R Vasumathi had allegedly blocked the telecast of Prime Minister Narendra Modi's speech at IIT Madras.

In March 2020, Prasar Bharati CEO Shashi Shekhar Vempati turned down BBC invite for an awards function, alleging that the BBC did “one-sided” reporting on Delhi violence in February 2020. In his letter to BBC Director General, Vempati said, “I must respectfully decline the invitation in view of the recent coverage of the BBC of certain incidents of violence in Delhi.”

In February 2021, Twitter blocked the account of Prasar Bharati CEO Shashi Shekhar Vempati for using a hashtag which was deemed inappropriate by the government. BJP MP Meenakshi Lekhi, who chairs the Parliamentary Committee on Data Protection Bill, condemned blocking of Prasar Bharati CEO's account, saying that Twitter has "victimised the person who told you to take the right step”. The account was restored later in the day.

In October 2021, a few media reports alleged that Prasar Bharati is shutting down transmission from DD Kalaburagi and DD Silchar. Taking note of these reports, Prasar Bharati clarified that broadcast reform steps to phase out obsolete analog terrestrial TV transmitters was being misrepresented. That these DD Centres will continue to generate program content for broadcasting on the satellite channels of Doordarshan dedicated to their respective States, apart from maintaining their presence on digital media via YouTube and on social media. For instance, program content generated by DD Silchar and DD Kalaburagi shall now be broadcast on DD Assam and DD Chandana respectively.

In an investigative article published on May 24, 2022, Newslaundry alleged that Prasar Bharati CEO Shashi Shekhar Vempati has immense power in Prasar Bharati. Newslaundry went on to elaborate upon how Vempati has acquired such powers. They quote from I&B Minister Anurag Thakur's speech in the Parliament, “Vempati was acting as chairman of the board in accordance with section 8 of the Prasar Bharati Broadcasting Corporation of India Act 1990 as the tenure of the previous chairman Dr A Suryaprakash had ended in February 2020.”

Newslaundry quotes an anonymous Prasar Bharati official to allege that Vempati has direct connection with PM Modi. According to Newslaundry, a senior Prasar Bharati official said that Vempati has the advantage of being in direct contact with PM Modi which is qualification enough to move forward in one's career today. Newslaundry also mentions that Vempati received the “Dataquest Pathbreaker award” from Dataquest magazine for his “outstanding role” in Modi's campaign.

Newslaundry further alleges that Vempati doesn't leave any chance to please the government, “That’s why he did not attend the BBC programme when questions were raised against the government after the Delhi riots. That was in March 2020. Vempati had declined an invitation to the BBC Indian Sportswoman of the Year Awards Night, citing the corporation’s “one-sided version” of the communal violence in Delhi the previous week.” Adding to this allegation of pleasing the government, Newslaundry further highlights that when Modi inaugurated the Kashi Vishwanath corridor in Varanasi, Vempati boasted about the “extensive preparations” made by DD for the visit, and that “about 146 TV channels in India carried Doordarshan’s live coverage of the day”.

References

External links 

Prasar Bharati India
NewsOnAir
DD News

Publicly funded broadcasters
Television broadcasting companies of India
Television channels and stations established in 1997
State media
Radio broadcasting companies of India
1997 establishments in Delhi
Ministry of Information and Broadcasting (India)
Government-owned companies of India